Scott Winston Colom (born December 24, 1982) is an American lawyer and jurist serving as the district attorney for the 16th Judicial District of Mississippi. He is a nominee to serve as a judge of the United States District Court for the Northern District of Mississippi.

Early life and education 
Colom is a native of Columbus, Mississippi. He earned a Bachelor of Arts from Millsaps College in 2005 and a Juris Doctor, cum laude, from the University of Wisconsin Law School in 2009.

Career 
From 2009 to 2011, Colom worked as a staff lawyer at the  Mississippi Center for Justice. From 2011 to 2016, he operated the Colom Law Firm. In 2011, Colom, then aged 28, was appointed the youngest and first black justice court judge in Lowndes County history. From 2012 to 2013, Colom served as a municipal court judge in Aberdeen, Mississippi, and interim justice court judge in Lowndes County, Mississippi. From 2013 to 2016, he served as the part-time city prosecutor of Columbus, Mississippi. He was the first Black city prosecutor for Columbus. Colom was elected district attorney for the 16th Judicial District of Mississippi in 2015, defeating a nearly 30-year incumbent, Forrest Allgood. Colom was sworn in on January 4, 2016. He was the first Black elected district attorney for the 16th Circuit and the first Black elected district attorney to a majority-white voting district in the history of Mississippi. He ran unopposed in 2019 and was re-elected.

Notable cases 

 In 2012, Colom represented Taylor Bell, a student at Itawamba Agricultural School who was disciplined by the school for publishing a rap song on Facebook that contained vulgar lyrics and criticized two coaches at the school. The district court dismissed Bell's challenge, however, the United States Court of Appeals for the Fifth Circuit reversed the dismissal, finding that the disciplining of a student for purely off-campus activities violates the First Amendment.

 In 2016, Colom supported the release of Steven Jessie Harris to a state mental health facility. Harris had been held for 11 years without a trial.

 In 2021, Colom dropped murder charges against Eddie Lee Howard. Howard spent 23 years on death row, after his conviction was based on debunked bite mark evidence.

Nomination to district court 

On October 14, 2022, President Joe Biden announced his intent to nominate Colom to serve as a United States district judge of the United States District Court for the Northern District of Mississippi. On November 15, 2022, his nomination was sent to the Senate. President Biden nominated Colom to the seat vacated by Judge Michael P. Mills, who assumed senior status on November 1, 2021. On January 3, 2023, his nomination was returned to the President under Rule XXXI, Paragraph 6 of the United States Senate. He was renominated on January 23, 2023. His nomination is pending before the Senate Judiciary Committee. Congressman Bennie Thompson initially recommended Colom for the role in a November 2021 letter to the White House.

References 

1983 births
Living people
21st-century American lawyers
African-American lawyers
American prosecutors
District attorneys in Mississippi
Mississippi lawyers
Mississippi state court judges
Millsaps College alumni
People from Columbus, Mississippi
University of Wisconsin Law School alumni
University of Wisconsin–Madison alumni